Dasytes is a genus of beetles in the family Melyridae.

D. plumbeus is a very common beetle on flowers in Germany, where it feeds on pollen. It is about 3 to 5 mm long.

European species

 D. aeneiventris
 D. aequalis
 D. aeratus
 D. albosetosus
 D. alpigradus
 D. alticola
 D. baudii
 D. blascoi
 D. borealis
 D. bourgeoisi
 D. brenskei
 D. bulgaricus
 D. buphtalmus
 D. caeruleus
 D. calabrus
 D. canariensis
 D. coerulescens
 D. creticus
 D. croceipes
 D. dispar
 D. doderoi
 D. dolens
 D. erratus
 D. flavescens
 D. fuscipes
 D. fusculus
 D. gonocerus
 D. graeculus
 D. grenieri
 D. griseus
 D. hickeri
 D. incanus
 D. inexspectatus
 D. israelsoni
 D. iteratus
 D. korbi
 D. lanzarotensis
 D. laufferi
 D. lombardus
 D. longipennis
 D. lucanus
 D. marginatus
 D. metallicus
 D. microps
 D. modestus
 D. moniliatus
 D. monstrosipes
 D. montanus
 D. montivagus
 D. moreli
 D. murinus
 D. niger
 D. nigricornis
 D. nigritus
 D. nigroaeneus
 D. nigrocyaneus
 D. nigropilosus
 D. nigropunctatus
 D. obscurus
 D. occiduus
 D. oculatus
 D. pauperculus
 D. plumbeus
 D. productus
 D. provincialis
 D. roberti
 D. setosus
 D. staudingeri
 D. striatulus
 D. subacuminatus
 D. subaeneus
 D. subalpinus
 D. subfasciatus
 D. tardus
 D. terminalis
 D. thoracicus
 D. timidus
 D. torretassoi
 D. tristiculus
 D. troglavensis
 D. variolosus
 D. virens

References
 Fauna Europaea: Dasytes (Retrieved on 2009-06-08)

Cleroidea genera
Articles containing video clips
Melyridae
Beetles of Europe